College of Engineering Bhubaneswar (COEB) is a private institute located at Patia, Bhubaneswar in Odisha. The college was established in the year 1999 under the aegis of the Nabadigant Educational Trust and is a part of the Koustuv Group of Institutions. CEB is approved by the All India Council of Technical Education (AICTE) New Delhi, Govt. of India and affiliated to Biju Patnaik University of Technology (BPUT), Rourkela, Government of Odisha. College of Engineering Bhubaneswar is accredited by National Board of Accreditation (NBA) New Delhi, Govt. of India.

Courses offered 
The college offers four year undergraduate B.Tech degree program in the engineering disciplines of:
 Automobile Engineering
 Computer Science and Engineering
 Electrical & Electronics Engineering
 Electrical Engineering
 Electronics and Telecommunication Engineering
 Information Technology
 Mechanical Engineering
 Civil Engineering

The college offers a postgraduate degree program  in M.Tech for two years in the engineering disciplines of:
 Computer Science Engineering
 Electronics & Communication Engineering
 Mechanical/Heat Power Engineering
 Power System Engineering
 Soil Mechanics & Foundation Engineering
 Structural & Foundation Engineering

It offers a three-year postgraduate degree program in MCA, two-year master's degree in MBA and a three-year B.Tech degree for diploma holders under a lateral entry scheme with the approval of AICTE New Delhi, recognised by the Govt. of Odisha and affiliated under Biju Patnaik University of Technology, Rourkela.

Admission procedure 

Admission to the undergraduate B.Tech program:Students are admitted through the OJEE/ Joint Entrance Examination (JEE MAINS) national level entrance test. There is a provision of lateral entry of 20% of the sanctioned intake for diploma holders directly to the third semester in their branch of study as per the BPUT guidelines.

Admission to the postgraduate M.Tech program:The students for postgraduate courses in M.Tech are admitted through their GATE and PGA scores and OJEE rank.

Admission to the postgraduate MCA and MBA program:The students for postgraduate courses in MCA are admitted through the OJEE, national level entrance examination. Students of MBA can also be admitted through CAT/MAT/XAT/C-MAT/AIMA/OJEE scores, which are another national level entrance examination.

Training and Placement Department 
This department is one of the major departments of the institute. Many companies come to participate in the campus recruitment programme.  Infosys, TCS, Wipro, Capgemini, Syntel, HP, Tech Mahindra, Piaggio, L&T Infotech, Slipco Construction, Ramtech Software Pvt Ltd, Genpact, Chainsys, and Unisys are a few of the companies which recruit engineers from this institute. Today the alumni of College of Engineering Bhubaneswar  exist in most of the global multinationals.

Hostels 

The institute has a in-campus hostel having both two- and three-seater rooms, for girls and boys. It is wifi enabled with a mess facility. The hostel provides round-the-clock security arrangements.

Associated institutions 
 Bhubaneswar Engineering College (BEC), Bhubaneswar
 Koustuv Business School (KBS), Bhubaneswar
 Koustuv Institute of Self Domain (KISD), Bhubaneswar
 Koustuv Institutes of Science (KIS), Bhubaneswar
 Koustuv School of Engineering (KSE), Bhubaneswar
 Naxatra Institute of Media Studies (NIMS), Bhubaneswar
Koustuv Institute of Professional studies (KIPS), Bhubaneswar

References

External links 
 

Private engineering colleges in India
Engineering colleges in Odisha
Science and technology in Bhubaneswar
Universities and colleges in Bhubaneswar
Colleges affiliated with Biju Patnaik University of Technology
Educational institutions established in 1999
1999 establishments in Orissa